Hinduism is the third-largest religious group in Canada, which is followed by approximately 2.3% of nation's total population. As of 2021, there are over 828,000 Canadians of the Hindu faith. Canadian Hindus generally come from one of three groups. The first group is primarily made up of Indian immigrants who began arriving in British Columbia about 110 years ago. Hindus from all over India continue to immigrate to Canada today, with the largest Indian ethnic subgroups being of Gujarati and Punjabi origin. This first wave of immigrants also includes Hindu immigrants who were of Indian descent from nations that were historically under European colonial rule, such as Fiji, Mauritius, South Africa, Guyana, Trinidad and Tobago, Suriname, and parts of coastal Eastern Africa. The second major group of Hindus immigrated from Bangladesh, Nepal, Bhutan, and Sri Lanka. In the case of Sri Lankan Hindus, their history in Canada goes back to the 1940s, when a few hundred Sri Lankan Tamils migrated to Canada. The 1983 communal riots in Sri Lanka precipitated the mass exodus of Tamils with over 500,000 finding refuge in countries such as Canada, the UK, Australia, Germany, France and Switzerland. From then on, Sri Lankan Tamils have been immigrating to Canada in particular around Toronto and Greater Toronto Area. A third group is made up of Canadian converts to the various sects of Hinduism through the efforts of the Hare Krishna movement and their Gurus during the last 50 years. The Toronto district of Scarborough has a particularly high concentration of Hindus, with Hinduism being the dominant religion in several neighbourhoods.

According to the 2021 Census, there are 828,195 Hindus in Canada, up from 297,200 in the 2001 census.

Hindu Population & Demographics

By province
The Hindu Population in Canada according to the 2011 National Household Survey.

By federal electoral district (2021)

The Hindu Population in Canada by federal electoral district according to the 2021 Census.

Ontario
1. Brampton East - 19.5%
2. Scarborough—Rouge Park - 18.6%
3. Markham—Thornhill - 16.8%
4. Scarborough—Guildwood - 16.2%
5. Scarborough North - 14.5%
6. Etobicoke North - 14.4%
7. Scarborough Centre - 13.2%
8. Mississauga—Malton - 12.8%
9. Brampton West - 11.8%
10. Brampton North - 10.9%

British Columbia
1. Surrey—Newton - 6.2%
2. Surrey Centre - 4.9%
3. Vancouver South - 3.4%
4. Fleetwood—Port Kells - 3.3%
5. Delta - 3.0%
6. Vancouver Kingsway - 2.5%
7. Burnaby South - 2.4%

Alberta
1. Edmonton Mill Woods - 4.8%
2. Calgary Skyview - 4.5%
3. Edmonton Riverbend - 3.0%
4. Calgary Forest Lawn - 2.2%
5. Calgary Nose Hill - 1.9%

Quebec
1. Papineau - 4.3%
2. Pierrefonds—Dollard - 4.0%
3. Saint-Laurent - 3.2%

Manitoba
1. Winnipeg South - 3.0%

By ethnic origin (2021)

Total: 828,195 
South Asian: 768,785 
Visible minority (no further defined): 34,545
Multiracial: 8,715
White: 4,385
Southeast Asian: 4,150
Black: 3,780
Latin American: 2,815
West Asian: 720
Chinese: 175
Filipino: 60
Arab: 45
Korean: 10

Early Hindus
Early Hindus maintained their religious traditions in mostly hostile environment which viewed the so-called colored immigrants as a threat to the British culture and way of life of the time. These male pioneers could not marry brides from India up until the 1930s, and did not have the right to vote in Federal elections until 1947. Religious life was centred around homes and Bhajans organized by community members.

Since the 1960s many westerners attracted by the world view presented in Asian religious systems including Hinduism have converted to Hinduism. Canada was no exception. Many native born Canadians of various ethnicities have converted during the last 50 years through the actions of ISKCON, Arya Samaj and other missionary organizations as well as due to the visits and guidance of Indian Gurus such as Pramukh Swami Maharaj, Sathya Sai Baba, the controversial Rajneesh and others.

Later Immigrant Hindus
Due to the liberalization of Canadian immigration policies, many Hindus from India, Pakistan, Bangladesh, Sri Lanka, Nepal, Indonesia, along with Hindu Indian diasporic communities in Mauritius, Fiji, Trinidad and Tobago, Guyana, Suriname, Malaysia, Singapore, South Africa, and eastern African nations such as Kenya, Uganda, and Tanzania have arrived in the metropolises of Montreal, Toronto, Calgary and Vancouver from the 1960s onwards. In last 20 years many Hindus from Nepal have migrated to Canada. It is estimated that approximately 8000 to 10000 Nepalese Hindus are residing in Canada with their main concentration in Toronto, Calgary, Vancouver, Edmonton and Montreal. Canada government has pledged to resettle 6500 Bhutanese refugees of Nepalese ethnicity by 2012.The majority of Bhutanese Nepali are Hindus. By 2014 Lethbridge was home to the largest Bhutanese community in Canada. Nearly 6,600 Bhutanese Nepali, also called Lhotshampa had settled in Canada by the end of 2015, with approximately 1,300 in Lethbridge by August 2016.

Temple Societies

These communities have formed over 1000 temple societies across the country that essentially functions community organizations. Some of these associations also have established private schools in Tamil to compete with non-religious and Catholic school boards that most Hindu students go to.

One among the earliest Hindu temples in Canada was established in rural Nova Scotia, in Auld's Cove, near the border to Cape Breton Islands, in 1971. Hindu Sanstha of Nova Scotia was formed by some 25 families living in the area at the time. Lord Krishna is primary deity, and Indian community families from Sydney, Antigonish, New Glasgow, and even Halifax often assemble together to celebrate Hindu festivals. Temple welcomes everyone, people of different faith and culture, to participate in the festivals, in a growing multi-cultural population of the region. In 1972, British Columbia registered Hindu Temple Burnaby in the Province in Burnaby, and has been active since then and currently is one of the largest and most beautiful temple with more than 33 deities.

The largest Hindu temple in Canada is BAPS Shri Swaminarayan Mandir Toronto . It consists of two separate buildings, one of them being the mandir itself and the other being the Haveli, home to a large Sabha Hall, several religious bookstores, a small prayer room, the country's largest Indo-Canadian museum, a water fountain and a large gymnasium. It is the only Mandir built using Hindu traditions. The temple is built in the traditional Hindu style of Shikharbaddha mandir, which is made accordingly to the principles laid out in Shilpa Shastras, scared Hindu texts that describe the canons of traditionally architecture, and describes how the structure of a shikharbaddha mandir symbolically reflects the body of Purusha, or Cosmic Man. It took $40 million to build and opened in 2007, surpassing Hindu Sabha Temple in nearby Brampton, which held the old record.

Society

Organizations
There are several organizations representing the Hindu community in Canada. Among them the Hindu Canadian Network is the most prominent umbrella organization.

Contemporary Society
According to a survey conducted by the Angus Reid Institute in 2013, 42% of the Canadians had a favorable opinion of Hinduism which increased to 49% in the 2016 survey. When asked—would it be acceptable or unacceptable to you if one of your children were to marry a Hindu—in February 2017, 54% Canadians said that it would be acceptable, as compared to 37% in September 2013.

According to another survey by the Angus Reid Institute, 32% of respondents say that the influence of Hinduism “in Canada and Canadian public life” is growing. However, the study also found that a majority of Canadians (67%) “don’t know anything/understand very little” about Hinduism, while 4% “understand very well”.

Community and Impact 
Hindus in Canada are able to create communities that not only follow religious practices but also provide education, counselling, support and outreach services. These communities allow many Hindus from overseas to comfortably adapt when immigrating to Canada. When Hindu institutions and worldviews are not mirrored in the migrated country, it can hinder the process of adaptation through isolation and loss of identity. Racial-ethnic identity development involves identifying with and relating to a specific group and is found to be associated with particular health behaviors and mental health outcomes. Hindu communities enable Hindu immigrants and their descendants to preserve their culture and identity despite their displacement and maintain physical and symbolic links with their source country; especially immigrants who have been exiled and feel uprooted from their national and cultural identity.

Politics
Deepak Obhrai was the first and only Hindu MP in Canada.

Dipika Damerla, is the first, and so far only, person from the Hindu community to become a provincial cabinet minister in any province.

Vim Kochhar (the first Hindu appointed to the Senate), Raj Sherman (the first Hindu to lead a Canadian political party),

Bidhu Jha (the first Hindu elected to the Manitoba legislature).

Anita Anand is the first Hindu cabinet minister in Canada. She became a cabinet minister in 2019.

Attacks on Hindu community
In 2013 a Hindu temple in Surrey had three windows smashed. A baseball bat found there after the attack had Sikh markings.
In 2018, the Montreal-based production house “Art of Where' advertised yoga-capris carrying images of Hindu deity Lord Ganesh. Rajan Zed, who is president of Universal Society of Hinduism called this highly inappropriate as it hurts Hindus. He also urged "Art of Where" to offer a formal apology.
In 2021, when break-in was reported at Hindu Sabha temple and Shri Jagannath temple, both in Brampton. In 2021 January saw instances being reported in other temples including Maa Chintpurni Mandir, Brampton, Hindu Heritage Centre, Mississauga,  Gauri Shankar Mandir, Brampton and Hamilton Samaj Temple, Hamilton.
In 2022, the film, Kaali, made by Leena Manimekalai, was shown at the Aga Khan Museum in Toronto as part of a multimedia storytelling project, Under the Tent. The community was upset over the poster depicting Goddess Kali smoking a cigarette. High Commission of India to Canada raised objection over the disrespectful portrayal of Goddess. The Aga Khan Museum issued apology afterwards. Chandra Arya, Napean MP, also condemned the portrayal and welcomed the apology of Aga Khan Museum.
In 2022, the BAPS Shri Swaminarayan Mandir of Toronto was defaced by Khalistani extremists with anti-Hindu and anti-India graffiti. The Indian High Commission to Canada raised the objection. Chandra Arya, Napean MP, condemned the hate crime and expressed concern of rising incidents in recent times. Sonia Sidhu, Brampton South MP,  condemned the incident and asserted it to be unacceptable in multicultural society. Patrick Brown, Mayor of Brampton expressed his disappointment. Ruby Sahota, Brampton North MP, termed the hate crime 'disgusting' and demanded punishment for the criminals.
In 2022, the newly inaugurated Shri Bhagvad Gita Park in Brampton was attacked and the board sign was vandalized. Patrick Brown, Brampton Mayor confirmed the vandalism at the park and said that Canada has "zero tolerance" for such attacks. The Indian High Commission to Canada condemned the hate crime and demanded investigation and action against the perpetrators.
In 2022, controversial banners saying "Burnt Alive By Hindu Mobs" appeared in city which Deepak Anand, MPP Mississauga-Malton condemned. Reportedly, the Mayor of Brampton, Patrick Brown was asked by the Hindu community to remove hateful banners against Hindus from all over the city.
In January, 2023 the Gauri Shankar Temple of Brampton was defaced with anti-India and anti-Hindu graffiti. Consulate General of India in Toronto condemned the hateful act of vandalism and asked the Canadian authorities to investigate into the matter. Brampton Mayor Patrick Brown condemned the hate crime. Chandra Arya, Napean MP, condemned the anti-Hindu attack and called authorities for taking the rising crimes against Hindus seriously. The founder and priest of temple Shri Dhirendra Tripathi said "Khalistanis have caused fear among us. They have become emboldened and the community is uncertain about their next actions. Canadian authorities should take stern steps to curb their activities".
In January 2023, the New Brunswick legislature rejected a requested made by Rajan Zed to recite Hindu prayer at the opening of assembly citing that the Christian prayer is a 'well-established practice' and there is no intention to deviate from it. Several Hindu community and temple organizations' members expressed displeasure over exclusionary practices. 
In February 2023, the Ram Mandir of Mississauga was defaced with anti-India graffiti allegedly by Khalistani extremists. The Indian Consulate General in Toronto issued a statement condemning the attack. Mr. Patrick Brown, Brampton Mayor condemned the incident stressing importance of religious freedom and assured investigation by Peel Police. Canadian Minister of National Defence Anita Anand and Minister of Foreign Affairs Melanie Joly expressed solidarity with Hindu community facing repeated vandalism of their places of worship. The police has not investigated the motive behind the hate-crime but the Hindu community suspect that it is the Sikh separatists who are responsible for it given the content of graffiti.

See also

 List of Hindu temples in Canada
 List of Hindu festivals

References

External links

 List of Hindu temples in Canada
 Background of Hindus in Canada
 Hindu temples in Canada